Jens Christiaan Hubert Peter Willen Janse (born 1 July 1986) is a Dutch footballer who plays as a right-back for Terni Est in the Italian Promozione. He formerly played for Willem II (where he started his professional football career), NAC Breda, Córdoba CF, Dinamo Tbilisi, Ternana and VVV-Venlo.

Career

Early career
Born in Venlo, Janse began playing football with amateur team MVC '19 from Maasbree, the town where he grew up. When he became older, he began playing for the youth teams of VVV-Venlo, the biggest club in the city where he was born. He was soon spotted by PSV Eindhoven. In PSV's youth, he played as a right winger, but after taking the advice of skills- and talent coach Ricardo Moniz, he instead began playing as a right back. After playing great as a right back, PSV wanted to offer him a first team contract, but because of the presence of Kasper Bøgelund, Michael Lamey, André Ooijer and Michael Reiziger, he was advised to play somewhere else. Willem II showed their interest, and Janse decided to play in Tilburg.

Willem II
Janse was chosen to play for Willem II's first team at the beginning of the 2005–06 season. On 11 January 2006, Janse made his debut under the leadership of coach Kees Zwamborn in the match against Heracles Almelo. The match ended in a 1–2 defeat for the Tricolores. Janse profiled himself by making an assist, and getting a yellow card. In this season, Janse played in 8 more matches.

Despite his good entrance in the Eredivisie for Willem II, it took a long time until he played again. Although, the 2006–07 season was marked as the great breakthrough of Janse. When his biggest competitor, Nuelson Wau, became injured, the road was paved for a fantastic season for Janse. Often he was the only bright spot for the chaos characterized club. Because of his good performances for Willem II, his competitor Wau eventually signed with Roda JC.

On 24 January 2009, Janse made his first goal in the league in the away match against Feyenoord (1–1).

Janse signed with Willem II's rivals, NAC Breda on 8 April 2010 and he will join the side after the 2009-10 season.

Córdoba
On 7 July 2013, Janse signed with Córdoba, playing in the Spanish Segunda División.

Dinamo Tbilisi
On 15 February 2014, Janse signed a contract with Dinamo Tbilisi.

Ternana
On 5 September 2014, Janse signed a contract with Ternana Calcio.

Leyton Orient
On 20 September 2016 it was announced that Janse was joining Leyton Orient till the end of the 2016–17 season. He was sent off 14 minutes into his debut against Plymouth Argyle.

Italy
After a season at VVV-Venlo, Janse moved to Italy in September 2018 and joined the newly promoted Eccellenza amateur club Ellera Calcio. In December 2018, he then moved to Serie D club A.C.R. Messina.

Janse played 12 games in Messina, before returning to Ellera ahead of the 2019-20 season. On 28 August 2020, Janse joined FC Viterbo in the Italian Promozione.

Janse moved to Terni Est on 22 July 2021.

References

External links
 
 
 
 Jens Janse Interview

1986 births
Living people
Footballers from Venlo
Association football fullbacks
Dutch footballers
Netherlands youth international footballers
Dutch expatriate footballers
Eredivisie players
Serie B players
Segunda División players
Erovnuli Liga players
Serie D players
Promozione players
Eccellenza players
Willem II (football club) players
NAC Breda players
Córdoba CF players
FC Dinamo Tbilisi players
Ternana Calcio players
Leyton Orient F.C. players
VVV-Venlo players
A.C.R. Messina players
Expatriate footballers in Spain
Expatriate footballers in Italy
Expatriate footballers in Georgia (country)
Expatriate footballers in England
Dutch expatriate sportspeople in Spain
Dutch expatriate sportspeople in Italy
Dutch expatriate sportspeople in Georgia (country)
Dutch expatriate sportspeople in England